Silval Barbosa is the former Governor of the Brazilian state of Mato Grosso.

References

1961 births
People from Paraná (state)
Governors of Mato Grosso
Living people